The lira (plural: lire) was the distinct currency of Parma before 1802 and again from 1815 to 1859.

History

First lira
The Duchy of Parma issued its own currency until it was annexed to France in 1802. This lira was subdivided into 20 soldi (singular: soldo), each of 12 denari (singular: denaro), with the sesino worth 6 denari and the ducato was worth 7 lire. The currency was replaced by the French franc.

Second lira
After the re-establishment of Parman independence, a national currency was introduced in 1815. Also called the lira, it was subdivided into 20 soldi or 100 centesimi. However, this lira was equal to the French franc and the Sardinian lira, and it circulated alongside the latter. It weighed 5 grams, and had a purity of 9/10 of silver. Since 1860, Parma has used the equivalent Italian lira.

Coins

First lira
In the late 18th century, circulation coins included copper 1 sesino, billon 5, 10 and 20 soldi, silver , 1, 3 and 6 lire, and 1/14, 1/7, and 1 ducato.

Second lira
In 1815, silver coins were introduced in denominations of s.5 and s.10, L.1, L.2 and L.5, together with gold L.20 and L.40. Copper c.1, c.3 and c.5 were added in 1830. All coins until the death of Marie Louise were minted by the Austrian State in Milan. When the House of Bourbon rose to the throne in 1847, the Parman mint was re-opened but the intended issue of copper c.1, c.2 and c.5 was abandoned after the duke Charles III, whose effigy was presented on the coins, was assassinated in 1854. The only issued coin, L.5 of 1858, was struck in 1,000 copies.

References

External links

Pound (currency)
Franc
Currencies of Italy
Modern obsolete currencies
Duchy of Parma
1802 disestablishments
1815 establishments in Italy
1859 disestablishments